Nur-ili was the king of Assyria from  1484 BC to 1473 BC. His father, Enlil-nasir I, was king before him. Nur-Ili was the last king of an independent Assyria before the Mitanni Empire took control of it.

References

15th-century BC Assyrian kings
1475 BC deaths
Year of birth unknown